Durga Paudel (Nepali: दुर्गा पौडेल) (also Poudel) is a Nepali politician and a member of the House of Representatives of the federal parliament of Nepal. She was elected under the first-past-the-post (FPTP) system, as a candidate from Rastriya Janamorcha and with the support of the left alliance, from Pyuthan 1. She defeated Dr. Govinda Raj Pokharel of Nepali Congress. She received 47,514 votes to Pokharel's 31,286. She was one of only six women to be elected to parliament under the FPTP system.

At the third national conference of Rastriya Janamorcha in 2016, she had been elected as one of the two vice chairs of the party.

References

Living people
21st-century Nepalese women politicians
21st-century Nepalese politicians
Nepal MPs 2017–2022
Rastriya Janamorcha politicians
Members of the 2nd Nepalese Constituent Assembly
1971 births